The 1892 Victorian Football Association season was the 16th season of the Australian rules football competition.

The premiership was won by the Essendon Football Club, which finished with a record of 15 wins, 1 draw and 3 losses from 19 matches. It was Essendon's second consecutive premiership, out of a sequence of four consecutive premierships won from 1891 to 1894.

Association membership 
The size of the Association premiership increased to thirteen senior clubs in 1892, with the newly established Collingwood Football Club competing for the first time. The club was formed from the Britannia Football Club, which had been a leading junior club in the Collingwood area since the establishment of the VFA in 1877, and had applied to enter the VFA since 1889.

Ladder 
Teams did not play a uniform number of premiership matches during the season. As such, in the final standings, each team's premiership points were adjusted upwards proportionally to represent a 21-match season – e.g., Essendon played 19 matches, so its tally of premiership points was increased by a factor of 21/19. After this adjustment, there was no formal process for breaking a tie.

Notable events 
 Essendon's Albert Thurgood was leading goalkicker in premiership matches for the season, kicking 56 goals. He finished ahead of Fitzroy's Jim Grace (48 goals), Melbourne's Harry Graham (42 goals) and Port Melbourne's Bill Fraser (40 goals). Thurgood sealed the leading goalkicker title by kicking nine of Essendon's ten goals in the final round match against North Melbourne (Grace kicked three goals on the same day), and broke the season record of Phil McShane, who kicked 51 goals for Geelong in 1886.

See also 
 Victorian Football Association/Victorian Football League History (1877-2008)
 List of VFA/VFL Premiers (1877-2007)
 History of Australian rules football in Victoria (1853-1900)

References 

Victorian Football League seasons
Vfa Season, 1892